1987 was a twentieth century year. 

1987 may also refer to:
 1987 (number), the natural number following 1986 and preceding 1988

Astronomy
 1987 Kaplan, a main-belt asteroid discovered in 1952
 1987 YA, a Mars-crossing asteroid discovered on December 18, 1987
SN 1987A, a supernova first seen in 1987
NGC 1987, a globular star cluster in the constellation Mensa

Film and television
 1987 (film), a 2014 French-Canadian film
 1987: When the Day Comes, a 2017 South Korean film
 "1987" (Robot Chicken episode)

Music
 1987 (artist) (born 1987), Swedish pop musician
  1987 (What the Fuck Is Going On?), an album by the Justified Ancients of Mu Mu
 1987 (Fibes, Oh Fibes! album), 2009 
 1987 (Naser Mestarihi album), the full-length debut of Qatar-based rock musician Naser Mestarihi
 Whitesnake (album) or 1987, an album by Whitesnake
 "1987" (song), a song by Juan Campodónico
 Nineteen Eighty Seven, a 2005 album by Whitecross